Melodije Mostara (English: Melodies of Mostar) is a music festival held annually in Mostar, Bosnia and Herzegovina. The festival was first held in 1995 and has been held annually since then. It has become one of the premier music festivals in the region.

Festival winners
2018 Diego Zulijani Kad se spoje duše dvje
2017 Goran Škerlep Kad dođe kraj
2016 Nešto između Poslušan
2015 Zoran Begić Ja bi opet tebe volio
2014 Bruno Baković Dobro večer srećo moja
2013 Hrvoje Sto godina skupa
2012 Neda Ukraden feat. Kemal Monteno Ako smo vrijedni te ljubavi
2011 Taz feat. Vuco Sveta zemlja
2010 Igor Vukojević Kišni čovjek
2009 Jacques Houdek Dužna si
2008 Ivan Mikulić with Hercegovino
2007 Ivan Mikulić with Ja sam Hercegovac
2006 Ivan Mikulić with Igraj, igraj, nemoj stat
2005 ET with Noćas umiru stare ljubavi
2004 Lily with Kad Ljubav nije pobjeda
2003 Divlje ruže with Kad riječi zanijeme
2002 Lily with Borit ću se ja
2001 Thompson and Tiho Orlić with Stari se
2000 Alen Nižetić with Kad slavuji zapjevaju
1999 Antonio and Marinella with Ja ću plakat za tebe
1998 Giuliano with Evo noć
1997 Antonio and Nena with Dobra ti veče moja draga
1996 Mobitel with Pjevaj sestro, pjevaj brate
1995 Zoran Jelenković with Gdje si, moja Marija
Culture in Mostar